is a Japanese late night anime programming block airing on MBS. The timeslot was established in October 2006 with a Thursday night/Friday morning schedule, until April 2015, when it switched to a Friday night/Saturday morning schedule.

In its current form, the block airs as "Super Animeism" and the hour-long "Animeism" block on Friday night/Saturday mornings.<ref name="Super Animeism Announcement"

History

The block initially launched in October 2006 as a 30-minute programming block in order to broadcast anime titles which were co-produced by MBS, beginning with Code Geass: Lelouch of the Rebellion. The programming block later expanded to a one-hour block in April 2011. In April 2012, MBS relaunched the programming block as Animeism. In April 2015, the network reorganised the Animeism block from a Thursday night/Friday morning schedule to a Friday night/Saturday morning schedule, with MBS chief producer Hirō Maruyama stating that the change was done in order to prevent conflicts with Kansai TV's broadcast of noitaminA.

On March 8, 2019, MBS introduced the Super Animeism programming block, which expands the Animeism block by a half-hour starting from July 2019.

On March 23, 2019, it was announced at AnimeJapan 2019 that MBS, Kodansha, and DMM Pictures formed a two-year partnership to co-produce anime titles for the block, adapting works from Kodansha published manga or creating original works into anime, with Domestic Girlfriend being the first title produced through the partnership. The last title under this partnership is Blue Period and as of January 2022, the partnership has completely ended.

Partnership with Amazon Prime Video

From June 2017 to January 2019, Animeism signed a deal with Amazon to stream their series exclusively on Amazon Prime Video worldwide, with Rage of Bahamut: Virgin Soul and Altair: A Record of Battles becoming the first titles exclusive to Prime Video on June 29, 2017. In January 2019, the streaming deal was no longer in effect worldwide, with other distributors Sentai Filmworks, Crunchyroll and Funimation beginning to license titles from the block. Prime Video only exclusively streams titles in Japan.

Titles

See also
 Animated programming blocks in Japan

Notes

References

External links
 MBS anime - Animeism - Anime Shower

 
Mainichi Broadcasting System
2012 establishments in Japan
2012 in Japanese television
Anime television